Gareth Davies (born 18 August 1990) is a Wales international rugby union player currently playing for the Scarlets. His position is scrum-half. He is a fluent Welsh speaker.

Davies went to Ysgol Gyfun Dyffryn Teifi in Llandysul before studying Sports Development and Coaching at Coleg Sir Gar in Llanelli. He has been with the Scarlets since he joined the academy in 2006. He has over 100 appearances for the Scarlets scoring over 100 points.

Davies was the top try scorer in the Pro12 for the 2013-14 season, scoring 10 tries. This caught the eye of Wales head coach Warren Gatland to select him for the summer tour of South Africa in 2014.

International
Davies made his Wales international debut versus South Africa on 14 June 2014 as a second half replacement. He replaced scrum half Mike Phillips, he was selected on the bench for the second test against South Africa. On 20 March 2015 Davies played in the 61-20 win over Italy. He scored at least a try against Uruguay, England and Fiji in the 3 pool matches in 2015 Rugby World Cup. Davies was selected for the 2016 Six Nations squad - he started vs Ireland, Scotland, France and England, as well as being on the bench vs Italy. He scored a try against both Scotland and Italy.

Davies was called up as cover for the 2017 British & Irish Lions tour to New Zealand.

In 2019, Davies played in all five games as Wales won their first Six Nations Grand Slam since 2012. Beginning the campaign as a substitute in the first two matches against France and Italy, he regained his starting place against England, Scotland and Ireland.

In September 2019, it was announced that Davies had been selected as part of Wales' 31 man squad for the 2019 Rugby World Cup in Japan.

In May 2021, Davies was named as one of 3 scrum halves for the 2021 British & Irish Lions tour to South Africa.

International tries

References

External links
 Scarlets Profile

1990 births
Living people
Rugby union players from Carmarthen
Llanelli RFC players
Scarlets players
Welsh rugby union players
Wales international rugby union players
Rugby union scrum-halves
British & Irish Lions rugby union players from Wales